Hickory Hill may refer to several places:

United States 
(by state)
 Hickory Hill, Arkansas
 Hickory Hill, Florida
 Hickory Hill (Thomson, Georgia), listed on the NRHP in McDuffie County, Georgia
 Hickory Hill, Illinois
 Another name for the Crenshaw House, Gallatin County, Illinois
 Hickory Hill Park, Iowa City, Iowa
 Hickory Hill, Kentucky
 Hickory Hill, Maryland
 Hickory Hill, Missouri
 Hickory Hill (Clermont, New York), NRHP-listed
 Hickory Hill, North Carolina
 Hickory Hill (Hamilton, North Carolina), listed on the NRHP in Martin County, North Carolina
 Hickory Hill, Oklahoma
 Hickory Hill, Bedford County, Pennsylvania
 Hickory Hill, Chester County, Pennsylvania
 Hickory Hill, South Carolina
 Hickory Hill, Tennessee
 Hickory Hill, Texas
 Hickory Hill (Ashland, Virginia), NRHP-listed
 Hickory Hill (Glasgow, Virginia), listed on the NRHP in Rockbridge County, Virginia
 Hickory Hill (McLean, Virginia), the home of the Robert F. Kennedy family
 Hickory Hill, West Virginia
 Hickory Hill (Petersburg, West Virginia), listed on the NRHP in Hardy County, West Virginia

See also
 Hickory Hills (disambiguation)